Notable Chinese dictionaries, past and present, include:

See also
List of English dictionaries
List of French dictionaries
List of Japanese dictionaries
List of etymological dictionaries

External links
LIST OF CHINESE DICTIONARIES IN ALL LANGUAGES, 1967 United States Department of State Office of External Research

Lists of reference books